is a railway station in Tsuno, Miyazaki, Japan.

Lines

Layout 
The station consists of two side platforms serving two tracks at grade. There is no station building, only a simple shed has been provided on platform 1 as a waiting room for passengers. A bike shed is provided at the station forecourt which also has ample space for parking. Access to the opposite side platform is by means of a footbridge.

Adjacent stations

History
Japanese National Railways (JNR) opened the station on 21 August 1952 as an additional station on the existing track of the Nippō Main Line. With the privatization of JNR on 1 April 1987, the station came under the control of JR Kyushu.

Passenger statistics
In fiscal 2016, the station was used by an average of 51 passengers (boarding only) per day.

See also
List of railway stations in Japan

References

External links
Higashi-Tsuno (JR Kyushu)

Railway stations in Miyazaki Prefecture
Railway stations in Japan opened in 1921
Railway stations in Japan opened in 1952